The 1986 UK Athletics Championships was the national championship in outdoor track and field for the United Kingdom held at Cwmbran Stadium, Cwmbran. It was the fourth time the event was held in the Welsh town. The women's 5000 metres was dropped from the programme and replaced by a women's 10,000 metres event.

It was the tenth edition of the competition limited to British athletes only, launched as an alternative to the AAA Championships, which was open to foreign competitors. However, due to the fact that the calibre of national competition remained greater at the AAA event, the UK Championships this year were not considered the principal national championship event by some statisticians, such as the National Union of Track Statisticians (NUTS). Many of the athletes below also competed at the 1986 AAA Championships.

Fatima Whitbread won her sixth consecutive women's javelin throw UK title, while shot putters Billy Cole and Judy Oakes both won a third straight title. Amongst the men's 1985 champions, John Regis (200 m), Phil Brown (400 m), Kevin Capper (steeplechase), Geoff Parsons (high jump), Andy Ashurst (pole vault) and Mick Hill (javelin) successfully defended their titles. Kathy Cook was the only woman other than Whitbread and Oakes to have a repeat win. Sprinter Sandra Whittaker was the only person to reach the podium in two events.

The main international track and field competition for the United Kingdom that year was the 1986 European Athletics Championships. UK champions Fatima Whitbread and Jack Buckner (5000 m) went on to become European champions, while Yvonne Murray (UK runner-up) took a 3000 m bronze. The four countries of the United Kingdom competed separately at the Commonwealth Games that year as well. UK Championships athletes to become Commonwealth gold medalists there included Roger Black (400 m), John Herbert (triple jump), Liz Lynch (10,000 m), Sally Gunnell (100 m hurdles), Joyce Oladapo (long jump), Andy Ashurst (pole vault) and Billy Cole (shot put).

Medal summary

Men

Women

References

UK Athletics Championships
UK Outdoor Championships
Athletics Outdoor
Sport in Monmouthshire
Athletics competitions in Wales